KTRV may refer to:

 Tactical Missiles Corporation, Russia
 KTRV-TV, a television station (channel 12) licensed to Nampa, Idaho, United States